BuenAgente is a Spanish comedy television series that originally aired on LaSexta from 5 May 2011 to 2 December 2011. The cast is led by Antonio Molero, Malena Alterio, Arturo Valls, Carmen Ruiz, Patricia Montero and Raúl Fernández.

Premise 
Lola tells her husband Sebas that she is leaving him. Sebas does not give up and moves to a new residence (together with Olivia and Ana) near Lola's to try to be closer to his two children, Nata and Alex. The police station where Sebas works in is also welcoming new agents.

Cast

Production and release 
BuenaGente was produced by Globomedia for LaSexta. The series premiered on 5 May 2011, earning 1,853,000 viewers and a 9.2% audience share (the best premiere of any LaSexta original fiction up to that date). The broadcasting run of the 8-episode first season ended on 20 June 2011, averaging 1,205,375 viewers and a 6.6% audience share. As LaSexta decided to ax the series, shooting wrapped on 26 October 2011. The 11-episode second season ran from 7 September to 2 December 2011, averaging 878,364 viewers and a 5.1% audience share.

Season 1

Season 2

References 

Spanish-language television shows
LaSexta original programming
2011 Spanish television series debuts
2011 Spanish television series endings
2010s Spanish comedy television series
Spanish television sitcoms
Television series by Globomedia